|}

This is a list of electoral district results of the 1924 Western Australian election.

Results by Electoral district

Albany

Avon

Beverley

Boulder

Brownhill-Ivanhoe

Bunbury

Canning

Claremont

Collie

Coolgardie

Cue

East Perth

Forrest

Fremantle

Gascoyne

Geraldton

Greenough

Guildford

Hannans

Irwin

Kalgoorlie

Kanowna

Katanning

Kimberley

Leederville

Menzies

Moore

Mount Leonora

Mount Magnet

Mount Margaret

Murchison

Murray-Wellington

Nelson

North Perth

North-East Fremantle

Northam

Perth

Pilbara

Pingelly

Roebourne

South Fremantle

Subiaco 

 Walter Richardson was the sitting member for Subiaco, who changed from the National Labor party to the Nationalists prior to the election.

Sussex

Swan

Toodyay

Wagin

West Perth

Williams-Narrogin

Yilgarn

York

See also 

 1924 Western Australian state election
 Members of the Western Australian Legislative Assembly, 1924–1927

References 

Results of Western Australian elections
1924 elections in Australia